Jacques Lescot (August 1, 1594 - August 22, 1656) was Bishop of Chartres from December 1641 to 1656.

See also
 List of bishops of Chartres

Bishops of Chartres
1594 births
1656 deaths
17th-century Roman Catholic archbishops in France
Place of birth missing
Place of death missing